Teunom, a town in the Aceh Jaya Regency of Aceh province on the island of Sumatra in Indonesia, with a population of about 12,000, was reported to have "vanished completely leaving only scattered shards of concrete" as a result of the tsunami produced by the 2004 Indian Ocean earthquake. Officials stated that 8,000 out of a population of 18,000 were killed (January 2, 2005 story).

See also 

 Calang
 Meulaboh
 Tapaktuan

References 
 Leuser International Foundation
 ABCNews quoting Associated Press

Populated places in Aceh